Events from the year 1994 in Sweden

Incumbents
 Monarch – Carl XVI Gustaf
 Prime Minister – Carl Bildt, Ingvar Carlsson

Events

September
 18 September -  The 1994 Swedish general election.

Popular culture

Literature
 Synden, novel by Björn Ranelid, winner of the August Prize.

Sports 
 84 athletes competed for Sweden at the 1994 Winter Olympics
 The 1994 Allsvenskan was won by IFK Göteborg

Births
 27 February – Max Örnskog, ice hockey player.
 6 June – Moa Lignell, singer

Deaths
 5 July – Lennart Klingström, canoer (born 1916).

See also
 1994 in Swedish television

References

External links

 
Years of the 20th century in Sweden
Sweden
1990s in Sweden
Sweden